Risen is a 2016 American/Spanish biblical drama film directed by Kevin Reynolds and written by Reynolds and Paul Aiello. The film stars Joseph Fiennes, Tom Felton, Peter Firth, and Cliff Curtis, and details a Roman soldier's search for Yeshua's body following his resurrection. Columbia Pictures released the film to theaters in the United States on  February 19, 2016. It received mixed reviews and grossed $46 million worldwide.

Plot 
Clavius, a Roman Tribune, supervises the crucifixion of Yeshua (aka Jesus), and orders his men to guard the dead body. The body disappears, and the soldiers claim Yeshua's followers stole it to make it appear that He rose from the dead. So Pontius Pilate orders Clavius to find the body, to quell an imminent uprising in Jerusalem before the Emperor arrives. Clavius and his aide Lucius question people who claim to have seen Yeshua after the resurrection.

Numerous leads are dug up, and their accounts soon become increasingly miraculous and difficult to believe. Some of the followers, such as Mary Magdalene and a man named Bartholomew, seemingly speak only in riddles and refuse to betray any others. Clavius' intense investigation begins to disturb both Romans and Hebrews alike, and Pilate, under pressure from many sides and fearful of Caesar's wrath, becomes increasingly distant and unsupportive. Running out of new leads, Clavius revisits a disgraced Roman soldier, assigned to guard Yeshua's cave tomb, now a drunkard, and vehemently shakes the drunken man out of a lie that he had previously stuck to. The soldier recounts a fantastic story that, on the morning Yeshua disappeared, a blinding flash had appeared, during which the stone and ropes sealing the tomb disintegrated, and a figure appeared, accompanied by a booming voice that sent him and a fellow soldier fleeing in fear. Clavius does not believe him.

During a raid through a Jewish enclave, Clavius unexpectedly discovers a seemingly resurrected Yeshua with his apostles in a solitary abode. Stunned, he calls off the search, barring Lucius and his men from finding Yeshua and the apostles. Clavius goes inside the house and makes eye contact with Yeshua. Clavius is in disbelief as he saw Yeshua be crucified. That night, another Roman raid, led by Lucius and Pilate, attacks the building that Clavius had forbidden them from entering, and finds it empty, save a note from Clavius, who has decided to continue the investigation on his own. Having abandoned Roman polytheism and the god Mars, Clavius, at first distrustful of the group, soon joins Yeshua and his followers on a journey to determine the validity of his mortal rejuvenation, during which he talks to and befriends both Yeshua and the apostle Peter.

Pilate deduces that Clavius has apparently betrayed him, and dispatches a contingent of Roman troops, led by a promoted Lucius, to pursue him and Yeshua. Clavius assists the disciples in evading the Roman search party, and, when caught personally by Lucius, Clavius disarms him, then convinces him to let them pass quietly. Consequently, Clavius witnesses Yeshua's miraculous healing of a leper, and then the ascension of Yeshua into Heaven; after which the Apostles split up to resume their journeys, and Clavius bids farewell to Peter. Later, communicating his travels to a stranger in a remote dwelling, Clavius acknowledges the strangeness of the tale and its veracity, feeling he will never be the same.

Cast

Production 
The film was shot in Malta and Spain between August and November 2015.

Release 
The film held its world premiere on February 15, 2016, at the Highland Park Village Theatre in Dallas, Texas. Columbia Pictures then released it in the United States on February 19, 2016.

Home media 
Risen was released on digital media on May 10, 2016, and was followed by a DVD, Blu-ray and 4K Ultra HD release on May 24, 2016, from AFFIRM Films and Sony Pictures Home Entertainment. The film debuted in second place on home video sales charts behind Deadpool for the week ending May 29, 2016.

Reception

Box office 
Risen grossed $36.9 million in the United States and Canada, and $9.2 million in other countries, for a worldwide total of $46.1 million, against a production budget of $20 million.

In the United States and Canada, pre-release tracking suggested the film would gross $7–12 million from 2,915 theaters in its opening weekend, alongside Race and The Witch. The film grossed $4 million on its first day and $11.8 million in its opening weekend, finishing third at the box office behind Deadpool ($56.5 million) and Kung Fu Panda 3 ($12.5 million).

Critical response 
On Rotten Tomatoes, the film has an approval rating of 53% based on 132 reviews, with an average rating of 5.60/10. The site's critical consensus reads, "Risen benefits from a lighter tone than many faith-based productions, as well as a unique take on the Greatest Story Ever Told and a terrific turn from star Joseph Fiennes." On Metacritic it has a weighted average score of 51 out of 100, based on 28 critics, indicating "mixed or average reviews". Audiences polled by CinemaScore gave the film an average grade of "A−" on an A+ to F scale.

Richard Roeper of the Chicago Sun-Times gave the film two out of four stars, praising the different take on the story as well as the supporting actors, but criticizing Fiennes' stoic performance. Megan Basham of WORLD applauded the film, writing, "It's undeniably one of the higher-quality faith-based films to hit theaters in recent years, with acting, writing, and production values to rival other mainstream releases." Michael Foust of The Christian Examiner gave it 4.5 out of 5 stars and called it "a detective-type story that is inspiring and moving." "Yes, Risen is historical fiction, but it's largely harmonious with the Gospel story, incredibly well done, and not much different from those Sunday School discussions many of us take part in week to week," Foust wrote.

References

External links 

 
 
 
 

2016 films
American drama films
Columbia Pictures films
Films directed by Kevin Reynolds
Films about Christianity
Film portrayals of Jesus' death and resurrection
Cultural depictions of Pontius Pilate
Films shot in Malta
Affirm Films films
Films shot in Almería
Films scored by Roque Baños
American survival films
Portrayals of Mary Magdalene in film
2010s English-language films
2010s American films